1790 Volkov, provisional designation , is a stony Florian asteroid from the inner regions of the asteroid belt, approximately 8 kilometers in diameter.

It was discovered on 9 March 1967, by Russian astronomer Lyudmila Chernykh at Crimean Astrophysical Observatory in Nauchnyj, on the Crimean peninsula, and named after cosmonaut Vladislav Volkov.

Orbit and classification 

Volkov is a stony S-type asteroid and member of the Flora family, one of the largest populations of inner main-belt asteroids. It orbits the Sun in the inner main-belt at a distance of 2.0–2.5 AU once every 3 years and 4 months (1,223 days). Its orbit has an eccentricity of 0.10 and an inclination of 5° with respect to the ecliptic.

Physical characteristics

Rotation period 

Two rotational lightcurves of Volkov were obtained from photometric observations by Robert Stephens and by French amateur astronomer Pierre Antonini in early 2007. The lightcurves gave a rotation period of 10.7419 and 21.455 hours with a brightness variation of 0.09 and 0.14 magnitude, respectively.

Diameter and albedo 

According to the surveys carried out by the Japanese Akari satellite and NASA's Wide-field Infrared Survey Explorer with its subsequent NEOWISE mission, Volkov measures between 7.08 and 8.67 kilometers in diameter, and its surface has an albedo between 0.241 and 0.511. The Collaborative Asteroid Lightcurve Link assumes an albedo of 0.24 – derived from 8 Flora, the largest member and namesake of its family – and calculates a diameter of 8.98 kilometers with an absolute magnitude of 12.4.

Naming 

This minor planet was named in honor of Russian–Soviet cosmonaut Vladislav Volkov, flight engineer of the Soyuz 11 spacecraft, who died at the age of 35 during the vehicle's return to Earth after completing the flight program of the Salyut station on 30 June 1971. The lunar crater Volkov is also named after him. The minor planets 1789 Dobrovolsky and 1791 Patsayev were named in honour of his dead crew members.

The names of all three cosmonauts are also engraved on the plaque next to the sculpture of the Fallen Astronaut on the Moon, which was placed there during the Apollo 15 mission, containing the names of eight American astronauts and six Soviet cosmonauts, who had all died in service. The official  was published by the Minor Planet Center on 1 July 1972.

References

External links 
 Asteroid Lightcurve Database (LCDB), query form (info )
 Dictionary of Minor Planet Names, Google books
 Asteroids and comets rotation curves, CdR – Observatoire de Genève, Raoul Behrend
 Discovery Circumstances: Numbered Minor Planets (1)-(5000) – Minor Planet Center
 
 

001790
Discoveries by Lyudmila Chernykh
Named minor planets
19670309